Kushk-e Olya (also Romanized as  Kūshk-e ‘Olyā and Kooshk ‘Olya; also known as Gūshk, Gushk Bāla, Kūshk, Kūshk-e Bālā, and Qoshk-e Bālā) is a village in Dashtab Rural District, in the Central District of Baft County, Kerman Province, Iran. At the 2006 census, its population was 392, in 92 families.

References 

Populated places in Baft County